Łużna  is a village in Gorlice County, Lesser Poland Voivodeship, in southern Poland. It is the seat of the gmina (administrative district) called Gmina Łużna.

The village has a population of 3,120.

References

Villages in Gorlice County